Beitun may refer to:

 Beitun District, Taichung, Taiwan
 Beitun, Xinjiang, county-level city